The Proceedings of the Institution of Mechanical Engineers, Part D: Journal of Automobile Engineering is a peer-reviewed scientific journal covering automobile engineering. The journal was established in 1989 and is published by SAGE Publications on behalf of the Institution of Mechanical Engineers.

Abstracting and indexing 
The journal is abstracted and indexed in Scopus and the Science Citation Index Expanded. According to the Journal Citation Reports, its 2013 impact factor is 0.645.

References

External links 
 

Engineering journals
English-language journals
Institution of Mechanical Engineers academic journals
Monthly journals
Publications established in 1989
SAGE Publishing academic journals